Mueller may refer to:

People
 Mueller (surname), a surname German in origin

Places

Antarctica
Mount Mueller (Antarctica)

Australia
Mueller College, in Queensland
Mount Mueller (Victoria)
Mueller Park, in Western Australia
Mueller River (Victoria)

New Zealand
Mueller Glacier
Mueller River

United States
Mueller Bridge, near La Vernia, Texas
Mueller Homestead, in Utica, South Dakota
Mueller State Park, in Colorado
Mueller Tower, in Lincoln, Nebraska
Mueller Township, Michigan
Robert Mueller Municipal Airport, an airport serving Austin, Texas, prior to the construction of Austin-Bergstrom International Airport
Mueller Community, a planned community on the former site of the airport

Extraterrestrial
4031 Mueller, an asteroid
120P/Mueller, a comet
136P/Mueller, a comet
173P/Mueller, a comet

Companies
C.F. Mueller Company, an American pasta company
Hengeler Mueller, a German law firm
Mueller Industries, an American manufacturing company of metal and plastic products
Mueller Lumber Company, formerly located in Davenport, Iowa, United States
Mueller Water Products, an American manufacturer and distributor of water infrastructure products based in Georgia
 Mueller Co., a subsidiary based in Tennessee
 Mueller Systems, a subsidiary based in North Carolina

Other uses
Barbier-Mueller Museum, in Geneva, Switzerland
Mailman Mueller, a 1953 West German film
Mueller calculus, a matrix method for manipulating Stokes vectors
Mueller Cloth Mill, a museum in North Rhine-Westphalia, Germany
Mueller report, officially named Report on the Investigation into Russian Interference in the 2016 Presidential Election
Mueller, She Wrote, a podcast that debuted in 2017
Mueller v. Allen, a 1983 United States Supreme Court case
Mueller–Hinton agar, a microbiological growth medium
United States v. Mueller, an 1885 United States Supreme Court case

See also
Müller (disambiguation)